Kkachi durumagi is a children's colorful overcoat in hanbok, traditional Korean clothing, which was worn on Seollal, New Year's Day in the Lunar calendar. It was worn mostly by young boys and literally means "a magpie's overcoat". The garment is also called obangjang durumagi which denotes "an overcoat of five directions". It was worn over jeogori (a jacket) and jokki (a vest) while the wearer could put jeonbok (a long vest) over it. Kkachi durumagi was also worn along with headgear such as bokgeon (a peaked cloth hat), hogeon (peaked cloth hat with a tiger pattern) for young boys or gulle (decorative headgear) for young girls.

Etymology and color

The name is composed of the two words in Korean; kkachi referring to Korean magpie and durumagi, a type of overcoat. In Korean mythology, magpies are regarded as auspicious messenger delivering good news but also a provider of prosperity and development. The date before Seollal has been referred to as "Kkachi Seollal" (kkachi's New Year's Day). The overcoat was named after the bird to reflect the folk belief because children longed for the cheerful holiday's coming.

Kkachi durumagi is also called obangjang durumagi because it is composed of five colors, representing five different directions (obang) – east (blue), west (white), south (red), north (black), center (yellow). The concept is based on Oriental philosophy.

Seop (섶), the overlapped column of the garment in the center is made of a yellow fabric while gil (길), the large section of the garment in both front and back side is made of a fabric in yellowish green. For boys, blue color is used for the portions called git (깃, a band of fabric that trims the collar), goreum (고름, strings at chest), doltti (돌띠, embroidered belt) respectively and purple is used for mu (무, gusset). On the other hand, kkachi durumagi for girls has red or purple colored git, goreum and doltti and dark blue mu. The sleeves are made of two sheets of fabrics. The outer surface is made of a yellowish green fabric or saekdong (colorful stripes) fabric whereas the inner is rose pink in color.

In old days, kkachi durumagi were worn as seolbim (설빔), new clothing and shoes prepared for Seollal, while at present, it is used as a dorot, a ceremonial garment for doljanchi, celebration for a baby's first birthday.

See also
Durumagi
Saekdongot
Jeogori, a Korean short jacket
Dopo
Sagyusam
List of Korean clothing

References

Korean clothing
Children's clothing
Coats (clothing)